The 1964 All-Ireland Minor Hurling Championship was the 34th staging of the All-Ireland Minor Hurling Championship since its establishment by the Gaelic Athletic Association in 1928.

Wexford entered the championship as the defending champions, however, they were beaten in the Leinster semi-final.

On 6 September 1964 Cork won the championship following a 10-7 to 1-4 defeat of Laois in the All-Ireland final. This was their seventh All-Ireland title and their first in 13 championship seasons.

Results

Connacht Minor Hurling Championship

Final

Leinster Minor Hurling Championship

Semi-finals

Final

Munster Minor Hurling Championship

First round

Semi-finals

Final

Ulster Minor Hurling Championship

Quarter-final

Semi-finals

Final

All-Ireland Minor Hurling Championship

Semi-finals

Final

Statistics

Miscellaneous

 Mayo won the Connacht title for the first and only time in their history.
 The All-Ireland final meeting between Cork and Laois was the first championship meeting between the two teams. It remains their only championship meeting.

External links
 All-Ireland Minor Hurling Championship: Roll Of Honour

Minor
All-Ireland Minor Hurling Championship